Samuel J. Hamrick (1929–2008) was an American spy novelist, who often used the pen name W. T. Tyler. Some of his novels include Rogue's March, The Consul's Wife, and Last Train from Berlin.

Hamrick also wrote a nonfiction book, Deceiving the Deceivers:Kim Philby, Donald Maclean and Guy Burgess, in which he speculated that Kim Philby and other defectors were unknowingly helping Great Britain dupe the Soviet Union, rather than successfully spying for the Soviet Union.

Sources
 
 

American spy fiction writers
1929 births
2008 deaths
American male novelists
20th-century American novelists
20th-century American male writers